The Carroll County Times was founded on October 6, 1911, as The Times. Owner and publisher George Mather, whose father owned the once-prominent Mather's Department Store in Westminster, Maryland, sold The Times in 1947. The Times expanded and became the Carroll County Times in 1956.

The Carroll County Times changed hands several times over the next twenty years. It was a twice weekly paper when purchased by Landmark Community Newspapers, a subsidiary of Landmark Communications, in 1974. The paper began publishing five days a week in 1980. Not long after, in 1987, the Times began publishing seven days a week and added home delivery.

In addition to the Carroll County Times, Landmark Community Newspapers of Maryland produces a number of niche publications including The Community Times, The Advocate of Westminster and Finksburg, The Advocate of Eldersburg and Sykesville, Carroll Families, Carroll Seniors, Purchasing Power, and Homes Magazines serving Maryland, Virginia, West Virginia, and South Central Pennsylvania.

On January 3, 2008, it was reported that the family owned Landmark Communications, parent company of the Times, may be for sale.  The Carroll County Times was acquired by The Baltimore Sun Media Group, and its parent company Tribune Publishing, in 2014.

Most content is now locked behind a paywall.

References

Fisher dean talks seismic sensors with Carroll County Times
Two Washington County horses rescued by Days End Farm

External links
 Official website
 

Newspapers published in Maryland
Westminster, Maryland
1911 establishments in Maryland
Publishing companies established in 1911
Tribune Publishing